The 2010 Tampere Open was a professional tennis tournament played on outdoor red clay courts. It was the twenty-ninth edition of the tournament which was part of the 2010 ATP Challenger Tour. It took place in Tampere, Finland between 26 July and 1 August 2010.

ATP entrants

Seeds

 Rankings are as of July 19, 2010.

Other entrants
The following players received wildcards into the singles main draw:
  Harri Heliövaara
  Micke Kontinen
  Juho Paukku
  Jürgen Zopp

The following players received entry from the qualifying draw:
  Ervin Eleskovic
  Markus Eriksson
  André Ghem
  Patrick Rosenholm
  Patrick Taubert
  Erling Tveit

Champions

Singles

 Éric Prodon def.  Leonardo Tavares, 6–4, 6–4

Doubles

 João Sousa /  Leonardo Tavares def.  Andis Juška /  Deniss Pavlovs, 7–6(3), 7–5

References
Official website
2010 Draws
ITF Search 

Tampere Open
Tampere Open